Marcin Bartłomiej Wilczek (born 25 April 1967 in Warsaw) is a Polish diplomat, Poland Ambassador to Turkey (2008–2012) and to Romania (2015–2019).

Education and career  
Marcin Wilczek graduated from the University of Warsaw Institute of Applied Linguistics (M.A., 1991) and the National School of Public Administration (1994).

He started his career in 1991 at Lot Polish Airlines. In 1994, he joined the Ministry of Foreign Affairs, beginning as a desk officer responsible for Albania and Turkey. Between 1997 and 2002, he worked at the embassy in London. From 2002 to 2005, he was the head of MFA Northern Europe section. In 2005, he became the Consul-General in Istanbul. From 2008 to 2012 he served as an ambassador to Turkey. After his return to Warsaw, between 2012 and 2015, he was the Head of Minister's Secretariat at the MFA. On 29 July 2015, he was nominated to be Poland Ambassador to Romania. He presented his credentials to president Klaus Iohannis on 10 September 2015. Wilczek ended his term on 31 August 2019.

Besides Polish, he speaks English, French, and Turkish languages. He is married, with two children.

Honours 

 Order of Honour (Greece)
 Commander of the National Order of Faithful Service (Romania, 2019)

References 

Ambassadors of Poland to Turkey
Ambassadors of Poland to Romania
Consuls-General of Poland
National School of Public Administration (Poland) alumni
University of Warsaw alumni
Diplomats from Warsaw
Recipients of the National Order of Faithful Service
Silver Crosses of the Order of Honour (Greece)
Living people
1967 births